The Delhi–Hoshiarpur Express is an Express train belonging to the Northern Railway zone that runs between  and  in India. It is currently being operated with 14011/14012 train numbers on a daily basis.

Service

The 14011/Delhi–Hoshiarpur Express has an average speed of 49 km/hr and covers 412 km in 8h 20m. The 14012/Hoshiarpur–Delhi Express has an average speed of 46 km/hr and covers 412 km in 9h.

Route and stops 

The important stops of the train are:

Coach composition

The train has standard ICF rakes with maximum speed of 110 kmph. The train consists of 17 coaches:

 1 First AC and Second AC
 1 AC II Tier
 2 AC III Tier
 5 Sleeper coaches
 6 General
 2 Seating cum Luggage Rake

Traction

Both trains are hauled by a Ghaziabad Loco Shed-based WAP-4 or WAP-1 electric locomotive from Old Delhi to Jalandhar and then by a Ludhiana Loco Shed-based WDM-3A diesel locomotive until Hoshiarpur and back.

Direction reversal

The train reverses its direction once:

See also 

 Old Delhi railway station
 Hoshiarpur railway station
 Hoshiarpur–Jalandhar City Passenger

Notes

References

External links 

 14011/Delhi–Hoshiarpur Express
 14012/Hoshiarpur–Delhi Express

Transport in Delhi
Express trains in India
Rail transport in Delhi
Rail transport in Haryana
Rail transport in Punjab, India
Railway services introduced in 2013